Gryźliny  is a village in the administrative district of Gmina Stawiguda, within Olsztyn County, Warmian-Masurian Voivodeship, in northern Poland. It is located in Warmia.

The village has a population of 614.

Gryźliny's landmark is the St. Lawrence church, dating back to the 15th century.

During World War II, the German Luftwaffe operated from an airfield located just southeast of the village.

 (1890–1958), Polish political activist, co-founder of the Association of National Minorities in Germany, was born in the village.

References

Villages in Olsztyn County